Gustav Gurschner (1873–1970) was an Austrian sculptor active in the decorative arts.

Gurschner studied under August Kühne and Otto König at the Kunstgewerbeschule in Vienna, and under Valgrin in Paris. He married the writer Alice Pollak in 1897. In 1898, he participated in the inaugural exposition of the Vienna Secession. From 1904 to 1908, he was part of the Hagenbund, a group of like-minded Austrian artists.

His body of work consists primarily of functional objects such as ashtrays, electric lamps, door knockers, and doorknobs, as well as some jewelry. Gurschner's style was influenced by the sinuous lines of Art nouveau and the symmetry of the Wiener Werkstätte. He worked in wood and bronze, bringing a wood-carver's sensibility to his bronzes.

In 1914, Gurschner designed medals and uniforms for the sovereign prince of Albania, Wilhelm zu Wied. In July of that year, he raised and led a small army of 150 volunteers to help the prince fight the rebels who laid siege to his capital of Durrës.
 
In the early 20th century, his work was imported to New York City galleries, as he was considered a significant Viennese artist. Today, Gurschner's work can be found in the Cooper Hewitt, Smithsonian Design Museum, Corning Museum of Glass, and the Petit Palais.

References

Further reading
 Gustav Gurschner and His Work, The Artist: An Illustrated Monthly Record of Arts, Crafts and Industries vol. 28 (1900)

1873 births
1970 deaths
Austrian male sculptors
Art Nouveau sculptors
Members of the Vienna Secession
People from Mühldorf (district)
German emigrants to Austria-Hungary
20th-century Austrian sculptors
20th-century Austrian male artists
Sculptors from the Austro-Hungarian Empire